Ralph Calland (5 July 1916 – August 2005) was an English professional footballer, who played as a full-back for Torquay United. He was born in Lanchester, County Durham.

References

1916 births
2005 deaths
People from Lanchester, County Durham
Footballers from County Durham
English footballers
Torquay United F.C. players
Association football fullbacks
Charlton Athletic F.C. players
English Football League players
Bexley United F.C. players